The Explorer Ellipse is an American homebuilt aircraft that was designed by Dean Wilson and produced by Explorer Aviation of Grangeville, Idaho. When it was available the aircraft was supplied as a kit for amateur construction.

Design and development
The Ellipse features a strut-braced high-wing that has an elliptical planform, a four-seat enclosed cabin with doors, fixed conventional landing gear and a single engine in tractor configuration.

The aircraft fuselage is made from welded 4130 steel tubing with a wooden wing. The aircraft is covered in doped aircraft fabric. The wings can be folded in five minutes by one person to facilitate ground transportation or storage.

The kit originally came with the complex wings already built and as a result the designer estimated the construction time from the supplied kit as 1000 hours. Float and ski fittings were included in the kit as standard equipment.

Operational history
By 1998 the company reported that three kits had been sold and one aircraft was flying.

In December 2013 two examples were registered in the United States with the Federal Aviation Administration, although at one time four had been registered.

Specifications (Ellipse)

References

Ellipse
1990s United States sport aircraft
1990s United States civil utility aircraft
Single-engined tractor aircraft
High-wing aircraft
Homebuilt aircraft